Sand fox can refer to any of these animal species:

Rüppell's fox
Tibetan sand fox

Animal common name disambiguation pages